Pogoria may refer to
Pogoria (lakes), a set of four lakes in Poland.
Pogoria (ship), a Polish Sail Training Ship launched in 1980.
Pogoria (train), a Polish named express train.